Hoke County is a county in the U.S. state of North Carolina. As of the 2020 census, its population was 52,082. Its county seat is Raeford.

Hoke County is part of the Fayetteville metropolitan statistical area. The county is home to part of the Fort Bragg military reservation.

History
The county was formed in 1911 from parts of Cumberland and Robeson Counties. It was named for Robert F. Hoke, a Confederate general in the American Civil War.

Geography

State and local protected areas 
 Calloway Forest Preserve
 Hoke Community Forest
 Lumber River State Park (part)
 Rockfish Game Lands
 Sandhills Game Land (part)

Major water bodies 
 Little River (Cape Fear River tributary)
 Little Rockfish Lake
 MacArthur Lake
 Rockfish Creek (Cape Fear River tributary)

Adjacent counties 
 Moore County - northwest
 Cumberland County - east
 Robeson County - south
 Scotland County - southwest

Major highways

Major Infrastructure 
 Fort Bragg (part)
 Mackall Army Air Field (part)

Demographics

2020 census

As of the 2020 United States census, there were 52,082 people, 17,799 households, and 12,300 families residing in the county.

2010 census
As of the census of 2010,  46,952 people, 11,373 households, and 8,745 families resided in the county.  The population density was 86 people per square mile (33/km2).  The 12,518 housing units averaged 32 per square mile (12/km2).  The racial makeup of the county was 44.53% White, 37.64% African American, 11.45% Native American, 0.83% Asian, 0.15% Pacific Islander, 3.27% from other races, and 2.13% from two or more races. About 7.18% of the population were Hispanic or Latino of any race.

2005 census estimate 
By 2005, 42.1% of the population was non-Hispanic whites; 10.1% of the population was Native American. 36.3% of the population was African-Americans. 9.8% of the population was Latino. 1.8% of the population reported more than one race (but it should be remembered that this category excluded Latinos) and 1.0% of the population was Asian.

2000 census 
In 2000, of the 11,373 households, 41.40% had children under the age of 18 living with them, 52.70% were married couples living together, 18.20% had a female householder with no husband present, and 23.10% were not families. About 19.00% of all households were made up of individuals, and 5.80% had someone living alone who was 65 years of age or older.  The average household size was 2.86 and the average family size was 3.22.

In the county, the population was distributed as 29.80% under the age of 18, 10.70% from 18 to 24, 34.10% from 25 to 44, 17.60% from 45 to 64, and 7.70% who were 65 years of age or older.  The median age was 30 years. For every 100 females, there were 102.00 males.  For every 100 females age 18 and over, there were 101.30 males.

Males had a median income of $27,925 versus $21,184 for females. The per capita income for the county was $13,635. About 14.40% of families and 17.70% of the population were below the poverty line, including 22.40% of those under age 18 and 22.00% of those age 65 or over.

Government and politics
Hoke County is a member of the Lumber River Council of Governments, a regional planning board representing five counties.

Education
Most of the county is in Hoke County Schools. However sections in Fort Bragg are served by schools in the Department of Defense Education Activity (DoDEA), for grades K-8. However high school level students living on Fort Bragg go to the local public high schools operated by the respective county they live in.

Communities

City
 Raeford (county seat and largest city)

Census-designated places
 Ashley Heights
 Bowmore
 Dundarrach
 Five Points
 Rockfish
 Silver City

Townships

 Allendale
 Antioch
 Blue Springs
 Fort Bragg Military Reservation
 McLauchlin
 Raeford
 Quewhiffle
 Stonewall

See also
 List of counties in North Carolina
 National Register of Historic Places listings in Hoke County, North Carolina
 North Carolina State Parks
 North Carolina in the American Civil War
 Sandhills, region in southern North Carolina
 Lumbee Tribe of North Carolina, state-recognized tribe that resides in the county

References

Further reading

External links

 
 

 
Sandhills (Carolina)
Fayetteville, North Carolina metropolitan area
1911 establishments in North Carolina
Populated places established in 1911
Majority-minority counties in North Carolina